The lesser false vampire bat (Megaderma spasma) is a bat found in South Asia and Southeast Asia from Sri Lanka and India in the west to Indonesia and the Philippines in the east. They live in caves and tree hollows. They are insectivorous.

The lesser false vampire bat has yellowish veins through the wing, and when the wings are spread with light behind, they are given a prominent yellow/orange tinge. Their body colour ranges from grey-brown to blue-brown. Lesser false vampire bats live in rock crevices, caves, foliage and hollow trees, depending on availability, as well as hanging and sleeping on trees in general.

Megaderma spasma is from the order Chiroptera and family Megadermatidae which comprises four genera and five species. M. spasma also known as lesser false vampire. Its type locality was in Indonesia, Molucca Islands and Ternate. There are two specimens of M. spasma collected in Sarawak Museum Unimas, one from Niah and another one from batu 16, Ulu Gombak. M. spasma was distributed in India to Indochina and Malay Peninsula, Sri Lanka, Andaman Islands, Sumatra, Borneo, Moluccas, Philippines, Sulawesi and other Indonesian islands. In Borneo, it can found in Sepilok, Darvel Bay area in Sabah, Niah and Kuching in Sarawak, upper S. Kapuas in West and upper S. Tengah in South Kalimantan. It is most closely related to the greater false vampire bat, which is the only other species in the genus Megaderma.

M. spasma has fur pale grey to grey-brown in colour. Its noseleaf has long dorsal lobe with stiffened central ridge and broad convex flaps on the sides. Its ears are very large, joined at the base and it has no visible tail. Its echolocation pulses are short, low in density and broadband and its large ears are sensitive to echoes returning from their pulses and also sensitive to the sounds that prey generates. M. spasma usually roosts in groups in caves, pits, building, and hollow trees. M. spasma favours grasshoppers and moths but sometimes they eat small vertebrates including other bats. They have well developed, forward-pointing eyes and can locate prey visually.

M. spasma usually roosts in a group of 3–30 individuals. Their ecological importance may be both positive and negative to humans. They eat some insects which harm human crops, but they may carry and transmit certain diseases.

References

Megadermatidae
Bats of Asia
Bats of Southeast Asia
Bats of Indonesia
Bats of Malaysia
Mammals of Bangladesh
Mammals of Borneo
Mammals of Brunei
Mammals of Myanmar
Mammals of Cambodia
Mammals of India
Mammals of Laos
Mammals of the Philippines
Mammals of Singapore
Mammals of Sri Lanka
Mammals of Thailand
Mammals of Vietnam
Least concern biota of Asia
Mammals described in 1758
Taxa named by Carl Linnaeus
Bats of India